Colonel Sir John Sinclair, 1st Baronet,  (10 May 1754 – 21 December 1835), was a Scottish politician, military officer, planter and writer who was one of the first people to use the word "statistics" in the English language in his pioneering work, Statistical Accounts of Scotland, which was published in 21 volumes.

Life

Sinclair was the eldest son of George Sinclair of Ulbster (d. 1770), a member of the family of the earls of Caithness, and his wife Lady Janet Sutherland. He was born at Thurso Castle, Caithness. He was educated at the High School in Edinburgh.

After studying law at the universities of Edinburgh and Glasgow and Trinity College, Oxford, he completed his legal studies at Lincoln's Inn in London in 1774. He was admitted to the Faculty of Advocates in Scotland in 1775, and also called to the English bar, although he never practised. He had inherited his father's estates in 1770 and had no financial need to work.

In 1780, he was returned to the House of Commons for the Caithness constituency, and subsequently represented several English constituencies, his parliamentary career extending, with few interruptions, until 1811. Sinclair established at Edinburgh a society for the improvement of British wool, and was mainly instrumental in the creation of the Board of Agriculture, of which he was the first president.

In 1788 he played a leading part in the formation of the African Association, founded to promote knowledge of Africa.

In 1794, Sinclair raised the Rothesay and Caithness Fencibles, the first of the Highland Fencible Corps which could be called to serve in the entirety of Great Britain and not merely Scotland. He later raised a second fencible unit, the Caithness Highlanders, who would go on to serve in Ireland during the Irish Rebellion of 1798.

His reputation as a financier and economist had been established by the publication, in 1784, of his History of the Public Revenue of the British Empire; in 1793 widespread ruin was prevented by the adoption of his plan for the issue of Exchequer Bills; and it was on his advice that, in 1797, Pitt issued the "loyalty loan" of 18 millions for the prosecution of the war.

From 1800 until 1816, he lived with his family at 6 Charlotte Square (now known as Bute House) in Edinburgh.

During his life, Sinclair acquired ownership of slave plantations in Saint Vincent and 610 slaves. After Parliament abolished slavery in British Empire with the Slavery Abolition Act 1833, Sinclair claimed partial compensation for the loss of his slaves under the Slave Compensation Act 1837, but died before he received his payout.

He died at home, 133 George Street, in the centre of Edinburgh's New Town. He is buried in the Royal Chapel at Holyrood Abbey. His stone sarcophagus lies towards the north-east.

Family
Sinclair, who was made a baronet in 1786, married twice. On 26 March 1776 he married his first wife Sarah Maitland, the only child and heir of Alexander Maitland of Stoke Newington. Together they had two daughters, Hannah and Janet, who became a religious writer. His first wife died in 1785.

In 1788, Sinclair married Diana MacDonald, daughter of Alexander Macdonald, 1st Baron Macdonald, and together they had 13 children. His eldest son, Sir George Sinclair, 2nd Baronet (1790–1868), was a writer and a Member of Parliament, representing Caithness at intervals from 1811 until 1841, and married Lady Catherine Camilla Tollemache. His son, Sir John George Tollemache Sinclair, 3rd Baronet, was a member for the same constituency from 1869 to 1885. The first baronet's third son, also named John (1797–1875), became Archdeacon of Middlesex; the fourth son was Captain Archibald Sinclair RN; the fifth son, William (1804–1878), was Prebendary of Chichester and was the father of William MacDonald Sinclair (1850–1917), who in 1889 became Archdeacon of London; the fourth daughter, Catherine Sinclair, was an author.

Scientific agriculture
Sinclair's services to scientific agriculture were conspicuous. He supervised the compilation of the Statistical Account of Scotland (21 vols., 1791–1799) which was drawn up from the communications of the Ministers of the different parishes'. This became known as the "Old Statistical Account." In volume XX (p. xiii) Sinclair explained the choice of name and the purpose of the inquiry:
"Many people were at first surprised at my using the words "statistical" and "statistics", as it was supposed that some term in our own language might have expressed the same meaning. But in the course of a very extensive tour through the northern parts of Europe, which I happened to take in 1786, I found that in Germany they were engaged in a species of political enquiry to which they had given the name "statistics," and though I apply a different meaning to that word—for by "statistical" is meant in Germany an inquiry for the purposes of ascertaining the political strength of a country or questions respecting matters of state—whereas the idea I annex to the term is an inquiry into the state of a country, for the purpose of ascertaining the quantum of happiness enjoyed by its inhabitants, and the means of its future improvement; but as I thought that a new word might attract more public attention, I resolved on adopting it, and I hope it is now completely naturalised and incorporated with our language."
For Sinclair, statistics involved collecting facts, but these were not necessarily, or even typically, numerical.

Sinclair was a proponent of new agricultural methods, and large tracts of land on his Caithness estate were let out to tenants who kept new breeds of livestock such as Cheviot sheep. This plan meant evicting the sitting tenants and giving them smaller plots of land to work, often in harsh coastal areas such as Badbea. Eventually many of the displaced tenants emigrated.

Sinclair was a member of most of the continental agricultural societies, a fellow of the Royal Society of London and the Royal Society of Edinburgh, as well as of the Antiquarian Society of London, a member and sometimes president of the Royal Highland and Agricultural Society of Scotland, and sat as president of the Highland Society of London in 1796. Also, in 1796, he was elected a foreign member of the Royal Swedish Academy of Sciences. He was elected a Foreign Honorary Member of the American Academy of Arts and Sciences in 1797.

Originally a supporter of Pitt's war policy, Sinclair later joined the party of "armed neutrality." In 1805 he was appointed by Pitt a commissioner for the construction of roads and bridges in the north of Scotland, in 1810 he was made a member of the privy council and, next year, received the lucrative sinecure office of Commissioner of excise.

When the Statistical Society of London (now the Royal Statistical Society) was founded in 1834, Sinclair at 80 was the oldest original member. In the same year he presented a paper on agriculture to the British Association for the Advancement of Science, but this was found to lack "facts which can be stated numerically."

Measuring wellbeing
Around 1790 he wrote about analysing the "quantum of happiness" in the people of Scotland.

Archaeological recording
Sinclair's works sometimes were the first recording of details of archaeological monuments of Scotland. For example, the first recorded mention of the Catto Long Barrow in Aberdeenshire was made by Sinclair in 1795.

Writings
He was the author of the books Statistical Accounts of Scotland; History of the Public Revenue of the British Empire 1784; The Code of Health and Longevity 1807; Code of Agriculture 1819. After a tour of agricultural inquiry in Flanders in 1815 he wrote a pamphlet: "Hints Regarding the Agriculture State of the Netherlands, Compared with that of Great Britain", Mc Millan, Londen, 1815.

References

Sources

 John Sinclair. The Correspondence of the Right Honourable Sir John Sinclair, Bart. With Reminiscences of the Most Distinguished Characters Who Have Appeared in Great Britain, and in Foreign Countries, During the Last Fifty Years. 2 Vols. London: H. Colburn & R. Bentley, 1831. googlebbooks.com Accessed 12 November 2007
 Sinclair, Rev. John (Sir John's Sinclair's son). Memoirs of the Life and Works of the Late Right Honourable Sir John Sinclair, Bart. 2 Vols, Edinburgh: W. Blackwood and Sons, 1837. googlebooks.com Accessed 12 November 2007
 C. Michael Hogan. 2008 Catto Long Barrow fieldnotes, The Modern Antiquarian
 R. Mitchison, Agricultural Sir John: The life of Sir John Sinclair of Ulbster, London: Geoffrey Bles (1962).
 Rosalind Mitchison, "Sinclair, Sir John, first baronet (1754–1835)", Oxford Dictionary of National Biography, Oxford University Press, 2004, accessed 16 July 2005.
 "Sinclair, John", pp. 70–72 in Leading Personalities in Statistical Sciences from the Seventeenth Century to the Present, (ed. N. L. Johnson and S. Kotz) 1997. New York: Wiley. Originally published in Encyclopedia of Statistical Science.
 R. L. Plackett (1986) The Old Statistical Account, Journal of the Royal Statistical Society, Series A, (149), 247–251.
 Urban, Sylvanus. "Obituary" The Gentleman's Magazine. London: 1836. (pp. 431–433) googlebooks.com Accessed 12 November 2007

External links
Royal Society citation
 
 
For a biography published in 1856 see
"Biographical Dictionary of Eminent Scotsmen"
For a description of the "Old Statistical Account" (and the "New") see
Statistical Accounts of Scotland.
For more on the history of the term "statistics", see the entry in
Earliest Known Uses of Some of the Words of Mathematics: S.
 

1754 births
1835 deaths
Scottish agriculturalists
Agriculture in Scotland
Baronets in the Baronetage of Great Britain
John
Members of the Parliament of Great Britain for Scottish constituencies
Members of the Parliament of Great Britain for English constituencies
Members of the Parliament of the United Kingdom for English constituencies
Members of the Parliament of the United Kingdom for Highland constituencies
Fellows of the American Academy of Arts and Sciences
Fellows of the Royal Society
Fellows of the Royal Society of Edinburgh
Members of the Royal Swedish Academy of Sciences
Alumni of Trinity College, Oxford
Members of the Privy Council of the United Kingdom
Scottish antiquarians
Scottish economists
Scottish slave owners
Scottish mathematicians
Scottish non-fiction writers
Scottish statisticians
Alumni of the University of Edinburgh
UK MPs 1801–1802
UK MPs 1802–1806
UK MPs 1806–1807
UK MPs 1807–1812
People from Thurso
Members of the Faculty of Advocates
Members of the Parliament of Great Britain for constituencies in Cornwall
Scottish agronomists
British MPs 1780–1784
British MPs 1784–1790
British MPs 1790–1796
British MPs 1796–1800
People of the Scottish Enlightenment
Fellows of the Society of Antiquaries of London
Burials at Holyrood Abbey